Loricaria lata is a species of catfish in the family Loricariidae. It is native to South America, where it occurs in the Araguaia River basin in Brazil. The species reaches 27 cm (10.6 inches) in standard length and is believed to be a facultative air-breather.

References 

Loricariini
Catfish of South America
Freshwater fish of Brazil
Fish described in 1889
Endemic fauna of Brazil